Hypermaepha is a genus of moths in the subfamily Arctiinae. The genus was erected by George Hampson in 1900.

Species
 Hypermaepha maroniensis Schaus, 1905
 Hypermaepha sanguinea Butler, 1878

References

External links

Lithosiini
Moth genera